Bethpage is a station along the Main Line of the Long Island Rail Road. It is located at Stewart Avenue and Jackson Avenue, in Bethpage, New York, and serves Ronkonkoma Branch trains. Trains that travel along the Central Branch also use these tracks, but none stop here.

History
Long Island Rail Road (LIRR) tracks were completed on the present line in 1841. At first trains did not stop here, Bethpage appearing only as a notation ("late Bethpage") associated with the Farmingdale station to the east. By 1854, the LIRR stopped at a local station called Jerusalem.  A local post office opened January 29, 1857, with the name Jerusalem Station.  In 1867, the residents voted to change the name of the local post office to Central Park, and both that and Jerusalem appeared on LIRR schedules until 1936. The station and the post office were renamed Bethpage on October 1, 1936. In 1959, the station burned down and was replaced. Electrified service through the station was inaugurated in 1987.

Two nearby stations also had Bethpage in their name:
Bethpage Junction was a connection to the east of the present station where the LIRR crossed with the Central Railroad of Long Island, which was built in 1873. A platform was built to enable passengers to transfer. This is the location where the present Central Branch splits from the Main Line at Beth Interlocking one mile southeast of the Bethpage station on the way to Babylon station and the Montauk Branch. The LIRR built the B-Tower at Beth Interlocking in 1925 to replace hand-operated switching between the tracks.
Bethpage was also the name of the northern terminus of the former Bethpage Branch from Bethpage Junction to the former Bethpage Brickworks in the community now called Old Bethpage, but which was called Bethpage until 1936.

Service was continued by the LIRR at that location until about 1924.

Station layout
There are 2 tracks at this station with two 12-car high-level side platforms.

References

External links 

Unofficial LIRR History Website
Central Branch History
Bethpage Station (1990s)
B-Tower; 1986 and July 1993
1873 map showing railways on Long Island
Bethpage Junction History (Arrt's Arrchives)
Trains Are Fun
May 11, 1947 and 1952 Photos
NYCSubways.org
April 24, 1966 and September 1974 Photos
BETH Interlocking (The LIRR Today)
 Station from Stewart Avenue from Google Maps Street View

Bethpage, New York
Long Island Rail Road stations in Nassau County, New York
Railway stations in the United States opened in 1856